Testament of Youth is a book by Vera Brittain.

Testament of Youth can also refer to two adaptations:

Testament of Youth (TV series)
Testament of Youth (film)